Liselotte Marti (25 May 1956 – 16 June 2014) was a Swiss gymnast. She competed at the 1972 Summer Olympics.

References

External links
 

1956 births
2014 deaths
Swiss female artistic gymnasts
Olympic gymnasts of Switzerland
Gymnasts at the 1972 Summer Olympics
People from Appenzell Ausserrhoden